Bruk-Bet Termalica Nieciecza Klub Sportowy Spółka Akcyjna, commonly referred to as Bruk-Bet Termalica Nieciecza, is a professional Polish football club based in Nieciecza, Poland.

The team was established in 1922. The club was founded after World War II and took over the previously existing team. The team's official colours are orange and blue. In May 2015, after securing the second place in the I liga, the club reached the Ekstraklasa for the first time in its history.

With a population of only 750, Termalica Bruk-Bet Nieciecza is the football club from the smallest village in history to qualify to the top level of a European football league (the former record was held by Mjällby AIF).

In 2021, they had finished as the I liga runners-up and won the promotion to the Ekstraklasa, for the second time in their history.

Club names

From 1946 – LZS Nieciecza
From 2004 – LKS Nieciecza
From the spring round of the 2004–05 season – LKS Bruk-Bet Nieciecza
From the 2009–10 season – Bruk-Bet Nieciecza
From 17 June 2010 – Termalica Bruk-Bet Nieciecza KS
From the 2016–17 season – Bruk-Bet Termalica Nieciecza KS

Honours

Champion
II liga
  2009/2010

V liga
  2006/2007

Klasa A
  2003/2004

Other
I liga
  (2) Runner-Up 2014–15, 2020–21

III liga
  Runner-Up 2008/2009

IV liga
  2007/2008

Players

Current squad

Notable players
Had international caps for their respective countries.

 Poland
  Szymon Pawłowski (2017–18)
  Dawid Plizga (2015–16)

 Bosnia and Herzegovina
  Vlastimir Jovanović (2016-)
 Czech Republic
  Mario Lička (2015)
 Finland
  Joona Toivio (2018)
 Iceland
  Árni Vilhjálmsson (2018–19)
 Latvia
  Vladislavs Gutkovskis (2016)
  Vitālijs Maksimenko (2017–18)

 Lebanon
  Feiz Shamsin (2020-)
 Slovakia
  Ľuboš Hajdúch (2011)
  Ján Mucha (2017–18)

 Ukraine
  Artem Putivtsev (2016)

League results

References

External links
  
 TERMALICA BRUK-BET TV
 Bruk-Bet Termalica Nieciecza at 90minut.pl
  

 
Association football clubs established in 1922
1922 establishments in Poland